Sarah Kerruish is a documentary director, producer and writer.

Early life and career 
Kerruish grew up on the Isle of Man. She attended the University of Idaho, before moving back to London. In 1994, she was part of the team that created the documentary series Moon Shot, which won the Peabody Award and a Primetime Emmy nomination. In 1998, she directed the documentary Dreams Spoken Here, about deaf children learning to speak. She created a short film about the technical team in the White House during their last few days under the administration of Barack Obama. In 2018, she co-directed the documentary General Magic with Matt Maude, about the start-up company General Magic that was founded in 1989. Kerruish recorded footage at the company in 1992 for a promotional video, which was used in the documentary.

Filmography

References

External links
 
 General Magic: The Movie (official website)

American film producers
Living people
Year of birth missing (living people)